Halaal Ki Kamaai is a 1988 Indian Hindi-language action film directed by Swaroop Kumar, starring Govinda and Farah. The music was composed by Bappi Lahiri.

Cast
Govinda as Shankar
Farah as Sharmili
Shakti Kapoor as Robert
Raza Murad as Durgadas
Gulshan Grover as Jimmy
Manik Irani as Fuga
Om Prakash
Dina Pathak
Bhagwan Dada

Music

External links

References

1980s Hindi-language films
1980 films
Films scored by Bappi Lahiri
Indian action drama films